The list of parties to the Convention on Certain Conventional Weapons encompasses the states who have signed and ratified or acceded to the international agreement prohibiting or restricting the use of certain conventional weapons which may be deemed to be excessively injurious or have indiscriminate effects.

On April 10, 1981, the Convention on Certain Conventional Weapons (CCWC) was opened for signature. Mexico became the first state to deposit the treaty on February 11, 1982. The treaty came into force on December 2, 1983. Since April 10, 1982, states that did not sign the treaty can now only accede to it. The instrument of ratification, accession, or succession is deposited with the Secretary-General of the United Nations

As of the end of November 2022, 126 states have ratified or acceded to the treaty, the most recent being Malawi on September 23, 2022. Four states have signed but not ratified the treaty.

Ratified or acceded states

Signatory states
The following four states have signed but not ratified the Convention.

Non-signatory states

See also 

 List of parties to the Biological Weapons Convention
 List of parties to the Chemical Weapons Convention
 List of parties to the Comprehensive Nuclear-Test-Ban Treaty
 List of parties to the Treaty on the Non-Proliferation of Nuclear Weapons
 List of parties to the Treaty on the Prohibition of Nuclear Weapons
 List of parties to the Ottawa Treaty
 List of parties to the Partial Nuclear Test Ban Treaty

References

Further reading
 

Parties
Lists of parties to treaties